Matteo Luigi Brunori (born Matteo Luigi Brunori Sandri; born 1 November 1994) is an Italian professional footballer who plays as a forward for  club Palermo.

Club career 
Brunori made his Serie C debut for Foligno on 5 June 2011, in a game against Ternana.

On 1 August 2019, he joined Pescara on loan from Parma with an obligation to buy.

On 24 January 2020, Pescara bought out his rights early and immediately re-sold him to Juventus U23.

On 24 August 2020, he became a new Entella player on loan with an option to buy.

Palermo 
On 9 August 2021, he joined Palermo on loan. He made his debut with rosanero in a Coppa Italia Serie C game on 21 August 2021, which Palermo won 4–1 against Picerno. On 26 September, Brunori scored his first goal in a 1–1 away draw against Monterosi Tuscia. On 6 February 2022, he scored both of Palermo's goals in a 2–2 away against Campobasso, which allowed him to break the 10-goal barrier.

Brunori scored another brace in the following home match, which Palermo won 3–1 against Juve Stabia. With his goal against Turris, he surpassed his personal-best tally of 13 goals, which he had reached in the 2018-2019 season with Arezzo, and surpassed Lorenzo Lucca as top scorer of Palermo in Serie C. On 6 March, he scoring a goal in a win against Vibonese, reaching Şükrü Gülesin as player with more consecutive goals scored for Palermo (7). Brunori broke the record in the next match against Avellino.

On 24 April, in the last league match against Bari, Brunori scored one of the two goals that allowed Palermo to qualify for the play-offs. The following 10 June, he won the "Trofeo Facco" for the best goal of 2021–22 Serie C.

In the play-offs, Brunori contributed to the final promotion of Palermo, scoring four goals in 8 games, against Virtus Entella, Feralpisalò (2 goals) and Padova, in the final.

On 17 July 2022, a couple weeks after the end of the loan deal, Palermo announced to have permanently signed Brunori from Juventus, agreeing a four-year contract with the striker. On his debut as a permanent Palermo player, Brunori scored his first hat-trick with a Rosanero jersey, in a 3–2 Coppa Italia home win against Reggiana.

International career 
On 15 December 2022, Brunori was called up by Italian national team manager Roberto Mancini as part of a 69-player squad of "players of national interest" for a stage in Coverciano to be held from 20 to 22 December.

Career statistics

Club

Honours
Juventus U23
 Coppa Italia Serie C: 2019–20

References

External links

1994 births
People from Macaé
Sportspeople from Rio de Janeiro (state)
Living people
Italian footballers
Association football forwards
A.S.D. Città di Foligno 1928 players
A.C. Reggiana 1919 players
Aurora Pro Patria 1919 players
A.C.R. Messina players
S.S. Arezzo players
Delfino Pescara 1936 players
Juventus Next Gen players
Virtus Entella players
Palermo F.C. players
Serie B players
Serie C players
Serie D players